The German Port Museum (Deutsches Hafenmuseum) is a nautical museum in Hamburg. The German Federal Parliament's budget committee approved initial funding of €94 million to rebuild it.

Scope
The museum displays the commercial and economic history of Germany's largest port, and wider issues of worldwide trade.

Building Concept

The Peking and a Hadag ferry are already important elements, which are connected to the museum, among other old vehicles.

References

External links

Ports and harbours of Germany
Maritime museums in Germany
Museums in Hamburg
Naval museums
Proposed museums